Belize has competed at every edition of the Pan American Games since the fifth edition of the multi-sport event in 1967.  Belize did not compete at the first and only Pan American Winter Games in 1990. Belize's only two medals were won in softball.

Medal count 

To sort the tables by host city, total medal count, or any other column, click on the  icon next to the column title.

Summer

Winter

Medals by sport

References

See also